The 2022 Wisconsin State Senate elections were held on Tuesday, November 8, 2022.  Seventeen of the 33 seats in the Wisconsin State Senate were up for election—the odd-numbered districts.  This was the first election to take place after redistricting following the 2020 United States census, which moved a severe Republican gerrymander to a slightly more severe Republican gerrymander.  Before the election, 21 Senate seats were held by Republicans and 12 seats were held by Democrats.  11 Republican seats and 6 Democratic seats were up in this election.  The primary election took place on August 9, 2022.

Republicans flipped one Democratic-held Senate seat and achieved a two-thirds supermajority, entering the 106th Wisconsin Legislature with 22 of 33 State Senate seats.

Results summary

Source: https://elections.wi.gov/elections/election-results#accordion-5601

Close races
Seats where the margin of victory was under 10%:

Outgoing incumbents

Retiring
Kathy Bernier (R–Chippewa Falls), representing District 23 since 2018, announced in January 2022 that she would not seek reelection. Bernier had made news in 2021 by opposing her party's attempts to undermine the validity of the 2020 United States presidential election.  Prominent Republicans loyal to Donald Trump had called for her to resign or be defeated.
Janet Bewley (D–Mason), representing District 25 since 2014, announced on February 6, 2022, that she would not seek reelection.
Jon Erpenbach (D–West Point), representing District 27 since 1998, announced on December 9, 2021, that he would not seek reelection.
Dale Kooyenga (R–Brookfield, representing District 5 since 2019, announced in April 2022 that he would not run for a second term.
Jerry Petrowski (R–Marathon), representing District 29 since 2012, announced on March 10, 2022, that he would not seek reelection.
Janis Ringhand (D–Evansville, representing District 15 since 2014, announced on March 9, 2022, that she would not seek reelection.

Seeking other office
Roger Roth (R–Appleton), representing District 19 since 2014, announced in February 2022 that he is running for lieutenant governor.

Election results

Predictions

See also
 Republican efforts to restrict voting following the 2020 presidential election: Wisconsin
 2022 Wisconsin elections
 2022 Wisconsin gubernatorial election
 2022 Wisconsin Attorney General election
 2022 Wisconsin State Assembly election
 2022 United States House of Representatives elections in Wisconsin
 2022 United States elections
 Wisconsin Senate
 Elections in Wisconsin
 Redistricting in Wisconsin

References

External links
 Wisconsin Elections Commission
 
 
 
  (State affiliate of the U.S. League of Women Voters)
 

Wisconsin Senate
State Senate
2022